The Cyprus national baseball team is the national baseball team of Cyprus. The team represents Cyprus in international competitions.

National baseball teams in Europe
Baseball